George Robert Crotch (1842 – 16 June 1874) was a British entomologist and an authority on Coleoptera (beetles), particularly the ladybird beetles. He was the grandson of the English composer and organist William Crotch.

Biography
Born in Somerset, England, Crotch became interested in insects, especially Coleoptera, whilst an undergraduate at Cambridge University. He worked at the University Library, Cambridge. He collected insects in Europe and in the autumn of 1872, he left England on an entomological tour of the world, initially arriving at Philadelphia. In the spring of 1873 he arrived in California, where he collected insects until early July, when he traveled to British Columbia. In 1873 he accepted a position as assistant from Louis Agassiz at the Harvard Museum of Comparative Zoology with Hermann August Hagen. He made collections of Coleoptera and Lepidoptera during 1873 in California, Oregon, and Vancouver Island, as well as various areas of south-central British Columbia. He died of tuberculosis in 1874 in Philadelphia at age 32.

Crotch was the author of a number of books, including Checklist of the Coleoptera of America (1873) and A revision of the Coleopterous family Coccinellidae (1874). His Coleoptera collection from the Azores is in the British Museum, London while the European Coleoptera, Erotylidae and Coccinellidae were left to the Cambridge University Museum of Zoology.

He was an authority on the Coccinellidae (Ladybird beetles) and Erotylidae of the world. His younger brother William Duppa Crotch was also an entomologist, and the brothers worked together collecting the beetles of Gran Canaria.

Quote
"I am greatly indebted to Mr G. R. Crotch for having sent me numerous prepared specimens of various beetles belonging to these three families [Crioceridae, Chrysomelidae, Tenebrionidae] and others, as well as for valuable information of all kinds . . . I am also much indebted to Mr. E. W. Janson for information and specimens . . . In Carabidae I have examined Elaphrus uliginosus and Blethisa multipunctata, sent to me by Mr Crotch Charles Darwin.

Notes

Further reading

External links
BHL A revision of the coleopterous family Coccinellidae. London, E.W. Janson,1874.
BHL A revision of the coleopterous family Erotylidae Cambridge University Press,1901.

English coleopterists
19th-century deaths from tuberculosis
Harvard University staff
1842 births
1874 deaths
Tuberculosis deaths in Pennsylvania